Jainagar (also spelled as Jaynagar) is a town and a notified area of Madhubani district in the Indian state of Bihar.

As of 2011 India census, Jainagar had a total population of 21,782. Males constitute 51% of the population and females 49%. Jainagar has an average literacy rate of 79%, higher than the national average of 74.04%. Male literacy is 86%, and female literacy is 71%. 16% of the population is under 60 years of age.

References

Cities and towns in Madhubani district
Transit and customs posts along the India–Nepal border